Kristine Andersen Vesterfjell (sometimes written Westerfjell; 1910–1987) was a Norwegian, Southern Sami reindeer herder and an important advocate for Sámi shamanism and culture. She was from Lomsdalen, in Brønnøy municipality, Nordland.

Biography
Kristine Andersen Vesterfjell was born in 1910. She lived with her uncle, the reinsamen, Nils Andersen Vesterfjell.

Vesterfjell was one of the central figures that led to the finding of the "Runebomme fra velfjord" (Sámi drum from Velfjord) in 1969. Although she had never seen the drum in use, she knew where it had been hidden in the early 1900s, what the surface looked like, what the symbols meant, and how runebommes were used in the past. The last user of the runebomme was Nils' grandfather and her great-grandfather, Nils Johan Johannessen Vesterfjell (1819-1871).

Vesterfjell described the location of the drum as follows:—

Working with her, a sketch was made of what the drum skin had looked like, together with explanations of both structure and symbols. In 1969, Arvid Sveli and Herlaug Vonheim went on an expedition into the mountains to find one of the last remaining drums, and found it after an intense exploration in the inaccessible Henrikdalen.

Vesterfjell died in 1987.

References
 

1910 births
1987 deaths
People from Brønnøy
Norwegian Sámi people
Norwegian Sámi activists